Ucode may refer to:

 μcode or microcode
 Unicode
 Ucode system, an identification number system for tagging real world objects uniquely